The Minerals and Energy Advisory Council is an entity which represents the interests of resources and energy companies to the Government of South Australia. It was formed in 2015 in a merger of the Resources Industry Development Board and the Resources & Energy Sector Infrastructure Council. It is in a partnership with the Resources Infrastructure & Investment Task Force. In 2016, the MEAC discussed the future use of small modular nuclear reactors in South Australia and the need to legalise their deployment. The MEAC also prepared a report on the findings of the Nuclear Fuel Cycle Royal Commission to present to Minister Tom Koutantonis.

Membership 
As of May 2016 its members are:

References 

Business organisations based in Australia
Advisory boards of the Government of South Australia
Energy in South Australia
Mining in South Australia